Si Satchanalai is the northernmost district (amphoe) of Sukhothai province, in the lower northern region of Thailand. Si may also be transliterated as Sri.

Geography

Neighboring districts are (from the southwest clockwise): Si Nakhon, Sawankhalok, Thung Saliam of Sukhothai Province, Thoen of Lampang province, Wang Chin of Phrae province, Laplae and Tron of Uttaradit province.

The Phi Pan Nam Mountains dominate the landscape of the district.

History
Si Satchanalai was the second-most important town of the Sukhothai Kingdom. The ruins of its temples are now part of the Si Satchanalai Historical Park, which is part of UNESCO world heritage site of Sukhothai.

The district was renamed from Hat Siao to Si Satchanalai in 1939.

Administration
The district is divided into 11 sub-districts (tambons), which are further subdivided into 148 villages (mubans). There are two townships (thesaban tambon). Hat Siao covers parts of tambon Hat Siao, and Si Satchanalai covers tambons Si Satchanalai, Tha Chai, and parts of Nong O. There are a further eight tambon administrative organizations (TAO).

References

External links
amphoe.com (Thai)
Si Satchanalai Informations and History  (Thai:Translation ready)

Si Satchanalai